Liopasia anolopha is a moth in the family Crambidae. It was described by Eugene G. Munroe in 1963. It is found in Ecuador.

References

Moths described in 1963
Spilomelinae